Seemabaddha ( Shimabôddho; English title: Company Limited) is a 1971 social drama Bengali film directed by Satyajit Ray. It is based on the novel Seemabaddha by Mani Shankar Mukherjee. It stars Barun Chanda, Harindranath Chattopadhyay, and Sharmila Tagore in lead roles. The film was the second entry in Ray's Calcutta trilogy, which included  Pratidwandi (The Adversary) (1970) and Jana Aranya (The Middleman) (1976). The films deal with the rapid modernization of Calcutta, rising corporate culture and greed, and the futility of the rat race. The film won the FIPRESCI Award at the 33rd Venice International Film Festival, and the National Film Award for Best Feature Film in 1971.

Plot

Shyamal (Barun Chanda) is an ambitious sales manager in a British fan manufacturing firm in Calcutta, where he is expecting a promotion shortly. He is married to Dolan and lives in a company flat. He aspires to become the company director.

His sister-in-law, Tutul (Sharmila Tagore), arrives from Patna to stay with them for a few days. She is given a tour of the life they lead and the many upscale spaces they inhabit—the restaurants, the beauty parlours, clubs and race courses. Tutul, whose father Shyamal had once been a student under, greatly admires him and his idealism. Secretly she is envious of her sister's marriage with him.

Life goes on smoothly for Shyamal until he learns that a consignment of fans meant for export is defective just before the shipment of a prestigious order. The problem is that the fans were painted with a flaw. The company is under a contract requiring the shipment be delivered on time. There is a clause permitting delay in case of civil disturbance. To escape blame, Shyamal hatches a plan with the labour officer to provoke a strike at the factory. A factory watchman is badly injured, a false riot is organised, and a lock-out is declared. The delay caused by the strike and riot are used by the company to allow strikebreakers to make needed repairs.

For his "efficient" handling of the crisis, Shyamal is promoted, and there is congratulations all around. However, he has fallen in the eyes of Tutul and himself. He is finally at the top, both successful— and desolate.

Cast
 Sharmila Tagore as Tutul (Sudarsana)
 Barun Chanda as Shyamal (Shyamalendu) Chatterjee
 Paromita Chowdhury as Dolan (Shyamal's wife)
 Harindranath Chattopadhyay as Sir Baren Roy
 Dipankar Dey as Sen
 Ajoy Banerjee as Talukdar
 Haradhan Bandopadhyay as Nilambar
 Indira Roy as Shyamal's mother
 Promod Ganguli as Shyamal's father
 Miss Shefali

Awards
 33rd Venice International Film Festival: FIPRESCI Award
 1971: National Film Award for Best Feature Film: Satyajit Ray

References

External links
 satyajitray.org on the film
 UCSC page
 

Films directed by Satyajit Ray
Films based on Indian novels
1971 films
Films set in Kolkata
Best Feature Film National Film Award winners
Films with screenplays by Satyajit Ray
1970s business films
Bengali-language Indian films
1970s Bengali-language films
Films based on works by Mani Shankar Mukherjee